Kortkerossky District (Körtkerös rajon) is an administrative district (raion), one of the twelve in the Komi Republic, Russia. It is located in the south of the republic. Its administrative center is the rural locality (a selo) of Kortkeros. As of the 2010 Census, the total population of the district was 19,658, with the population of Izhma accounting for 20.0% of that number.

Etymology
Kortkeros' name was derived from two Komi words, кӧрт ("iron") and керӧс ("mountain"). Based on archaeological evidence and the names of locations (such as Körtyag, Lake Körtty, and the Körtvis River meaning "Iron Pine", "Iron Lake", and "Iron River" respectively), the village of Kortkeros was considered by archaeologists to be an ancient metallurgical centre.

Administrative and municipal status
Within the framework of administrative divisions, Kortkerossky District is one of the twelve in the Komi Republic. The district is divided into fourteen selo administrative territories and four settlement administrative territories, which comprise fifty-three rural localities. As a municipal division, the district is incorporated as Kortkerossky Municipal District. Its eighteen administrative territories are incorporated as eighteen rural settlements within the municipal district. The selo of Kortkeros serves as the administrative center of both the administrative and municipal district.

See also
 Kört-Aika Monument

References

Notes

Sources



Districts of the Komi Republic